Archibald Ralph Montagu-Stuart-Wortley-Mackenzie, 3rd Earl of Wharncliffe JP DL (17 April 1892 – 16 May 1953) was an English soldier, peer, and landowner, a member of the House of Lords.

Early life 
The son of Francis John Montagu-Stuart-Wortley-Mackenzie, 2nd Earl of Wharncliffe, by his marriage to Ellen Gallwey.

The young Montagu-Stuart-Wortley-Mackenzie was educated at Eton and the Royal Military College, Sandhurst, from where he was commissioned into the Life Guards.

Career 
He was aide-de-camp to Lord Buxton, Governor-General of South Africa, between 1915 and 1916, then saw active service during the First World War, rising to the rank of captain. On 8 May 1926, his father died and he succeeded as Earl of Wharncliffe and Viscount Carlton and as the owner of the Wortley Hall estate in Yorkshire.

Wharncliffe was a Justice of the Peace and a Deputy Lieutenant for the West Riding of Yorkshire.

During the Second World War, Wortley Hall was requisitioned for use by the British Army and deteriorated. In 1950, Wharncliffe sold it to be used as a training college.

Personal life 
On 24 March 1918, he married Lady Maud Lillian Elfreda Mary Wentworth-Fitzwilliam, a daughter of William Wentworth-Fitzwilliam, 7th Earl Fitzwilliam, and Lady Maud Frederica Elizabeth Dundas, whose father was Lawrence Dundas, 1st Marquess of Zetland. Their children were:

 Lady Ann Lavinia Maud Montagu-Stuart-Wortley-Mackenzie (1919–2022), who married Commander Vivian Russell Salvin Bowlby in 1939.
 Lady Mary Diana Montagu-Stuart-Wortley (1920–1997), who married, as his second wife, Henry Pelham-Clinton-Hope, 9th Duke of Newcastle.
 Lady Barbara Maureen Montagu-Stuart-Wortley-Mackenzie (1921–2014), who married David Cecil Ricardo in 1943.
 Lady Mary Rosemary Marie-Gabrielle Montagu-Stuart-Wortley-Mackenzie (1930–2017), who married Sir David Courtenay Mansel Lewis, the last Lord Lieutenant of Carmarthenshire.
 Alan James Montagu-Stuart-Wortley-Mackenzie, 4th Earl of Wharncliffe (1935–1987), who married Aline Margaret Bruce in 1957.

Lord Wharncliffe died on 16 May 1953 and was succeeded in his titles by his only son, Alan.

References 

1892 births
1953 deaths
Stuart of Bute family
Graduates of the Royal Military College, Sandhurst
British Life Guards officers
People educated at Eton College